One Voice: The Greatest Hits is a 2 disc greatest hits compilation album by Australian singer John Farnham. The album was released in Australia on 20 October 2003, and was accompanied by a DVD of music videos titled One Voice: The Greatest Clips. It was released to celebrate 35 years of John Farnham's career.

This album and subsequent DVD were released by Sony BMG to celebrate 35 years of John Farnham's music being commercially available in Australia. The album reached No. 2 in the ARIA charts. 

The compilation is an updated version of his 1997 hits package Anthology 1 with some newer tracks and notable pre-1986 singles added.

Track listing
Disc 1
 "We Will Rock You" (Brian May) – 3:06
 "That's Freedom" (T. Kimmel, J. Chapman) – 4:16
 "Age of Reason" (T. Hunter, J. Pigott) – 5:06
 "Pressure Down" (H. Bogdanovs) – 3:44
 "Don't You Know It's Magic" (B. Cadd) – 4:01
 "A Touch of Paradise" (R. Wilson, G. Smith) – 4:44
 "Help!" (John Lennon, Paul McCartney) – 4:23
 "When Something Is Wrong with My Baby" Feat. Jimmy Barnes (Isaac Hayes, David Porter) – 4:52
 "Chain Reaction" (D. Stewart, S. Stewart) – 3:11
 "Raindrops Keep Falling on My Head" (Hal David, Burt Bacharach) – 2:30
 "Sadie (The Cleaning Lady)" (Ray Gilmore, Johnny Madara, Dave White) – 3:16
 "A Simple Life" (J. Lind, R. Page) – 3:50
 "Burn for You" (P. Buckle, J. Farnham, R. Faser) – 3:32
 "The Last Time" (Mick Jagger, Keith Richards) – 3:26

Disc 2
 "You're The Voice" (M. Ryder, C. Thompson, A. Qunta, K. Reid) – 5:02
 "Two Strong Hearts" (B. Woolley, A. Hill) – 3:30
 "Everything's Alright" Feat. Kate Ceberano and Jon Stevens (Andrew Lloyd Webber, Tim Rice) – 4:47
 "One" (Harry Nilsson) – 2:49
 "Seemed Like A Good Idea (At The Time)" (1997 edit) (R. Wilson, J. Farnham, R. Fraser) – 3:45
 "Talk of the Town" (S. Howard) – 3:42
 "Angels" (2003 edit) (T. Kimmel, J. Kimball) – 5:35
 "Have a Little Faith (In Us)" (1997 edit) (R. Desalvo, A. Roman) – 4:45
 "Hearts On Fire" (1997 edit) (T. Kimmel, S. Lynch) – 4:16
 "Everytime You Cry" Feat. Human Nature (S. Peiken, G. Sutton) – 4:43
 "Reasons" (S. See) – 4:26
 "No Ordinary World" (L. Andersson, S. Davis) – 3:45
 "Man of the Hour" (S. Hostin, D. Deviller, S. Kipner) – 4:01

Charts

Weekly charts

Year-end charts

Decade-end chart

Certifications

References 

2003 greatest hits albums
John Farnham compilation albums